Lovepreet Singh may refer to:
 Lovepreet Singh (footballer)
 Lovepreet Singh (weightlifter)